Beniowa  (Beniova) is a former village in the administrative district of Gmina Lutowiska, within Bieszczady County, Subcarpathian Voivodeship, in south-eastern Poland, close to the border with Ukraine.

The part of the village now in Ukraine, called Beniova, has a population of about 60.

References

Beniowa